Rafael Leonardo Núñez Mata (born 25 January 2002) is a Dominican professional footballer who plays as a midfielder for Spanish club UD Almería B.

Early life
Núñez was born in Bonao, Dominican Republic and grew up in Spain.

Club career

Atlético Madrid
In 2015, Núñez joined the academy program of La Liga side Atlético Madrid. In June 2021, he went on loan with Atléti-owned Canadian Premier League side Atlético Ottawa. He made his professional debut on June 26 against FC Edmonton.

International career
In March 2021, Núñez represented the Dominican Republic at the 2020 CONCACAF Men's Olympic Qualifying Championship, making three appearances.

References

External links

2002 births
Living people
Association football midfielders
Dominican Republic footballers
Spanish footballers
People from Bonao
Dominican Republic expatriate footballers
Spanish expatriate footballers
Expatriate soccer players in Canada
Dominican Republic expatriate sportspeople in Canada
Spanish expatriate sportspeople in Canada
Atlético Madrid footballers
Atlético Ottawa players
Canadian Premier League players
Dominican Republic international footballers